Sandeep Acharya (4 February 1984 – 15 December 2013) was an Indian singer. He won the second season of the popular reality television show Indian Idol in 2006. Acharya was from to Bikaner, Rajasthan. He died on the 15 December 2013 in Gurgaon's Medanta Hospital.

Award 

Acharya was the runner up in 'Golden Voice of India'.

He was the winner of Indian Idol Season 2. Acharya's win gained him a  1 crore contract from Sony BMG, a music album contract and a brand new Maruti Baleno car.

Sandeep also participated in 'Jalwa Four 2 Ka 1 9X' in Mika's team.

Sandeep won the award for best new talent during the Bollywood Music Awards in Atlantic City, New Jersey.

Television
Acharya made an appearance as himself in romantic drama series Kaisa Ye Pyar Hai on Sony TV.

Death
Acharya died following an illness that caused jaundice on 15 December 2013. He was rushed to Medanta Hospital in Gurgaon as his health deteriorated. He was at a wedding in Bikaner when his situation worsened and his relatives had to rush him to the hospital, where he died. His younger brother informed media about his death, "Last night, doctors said his condition was under control and he was showing signs of recovery. We were all hoping we'd soon take him home. But nobody knew that he would leave us forever."

Discography
 "Mere Sath Sara Jahan"
 "Woh Pehli Baar" 
 'Indian Idol''
 Intezaar By Adarsh RM – Teri Akhiyon Ne and O Ladki

References

External links

20th-century Indian male singers
20th-century Indian musicians
20th-century Indian singers
1984 births
2013 deaths
Deaths from liver disease
Indian Idol winners
People from Bikaner
Rajasthani people